Hemiscyllium galei, the Cenderawasih epaulette shark, is a species of bamboo shark in the family Hemiscylliidae. Together with H. henryi, it was only scientifically described in 2008 by Gerald R. Allen and Mark V. Erdmann. It can be separated from its relatives (e.g., H. freycineti) by the combination of seven relatively large dark spots along the side of the body (between the abdomen and tail-base), white markings on the edge of its dark dorsal saddles and other scattered white spots on the upper side.

Etymology
The shark is named in honor of underwater photographer and shark enthusiast Jeffrey Gale, who bid successfully to help conserve the species at a charity auction, and who then financially supported Conservation International’s efforts to preserve its habitat.

References

External links 
 Michael, S. (May 13, 2008). New Epaulette Walking Sharks! Retrieved August 30, 2011.

Cenderawasihepaulette shark
Fish of Western New Guinea
Taxa named by Gerald R. Allen
Taxa named by Mark van Nydeck Erdmann
Cenderawasih epaulette shark